Wszebory may refer to the following places:
Wszebory, Sokołów County in Masovian Voivodeship (east-central Poland)
Wszebory, Wołomin County in Masovian Voivodeship (east-central Poland)
Wszebory, Podlaskie Voivodeship (north-east Poland)